Mensa may refer to the following people:
Given name
Mensa Bonsu (c. 1840 – c. 1896), tenth king of the Kingdom of Ashanti in present-day Ghana
Mensa Otabil (born 1959), Ghanaian theologian, philanthropist, motivational speaker and entrepreneur

Surname
Josep Pascó i Mensa (1855–1910), Spanish painter, illustrator and designer 
Vic Mensa (born 1993), American hip hop recording artist

See also
Winston Mensa-Wood, Ghanaian retired lieutenant general and former Chief of Defence Staff of the Ghana Armed Forces (1990–1992)